Volition is a 2019 Canadian science fiction thriller film written by Tony and Ryan W. Smith and directed by Tony Dean Smith. The film stars Adrian Glynn McMorran, Magda Apanowicz, John Cassini, Frank Cassini, Aleks Paunovic, and Bill Marchant. The film premiered at the 2019 Philip K. Dick Science Fiction Film Festival.

References

External links
 
 

2019 films
Canadian science fiction films
English-language Canadian films
Time loop films
Films about time travel
2010s English-language films
2010s Canadian films